Alternanthera brasiliana, also known as large purple alternanthera, metal weed, bloodleaf, parrot leaf, ruby leaf, Brazilian joyweed, purple alternanthera, purple joyweed, is a flowering plant of the amaranth family that is native to the forests of South America and as well as Central America. Grown as an ornamental plant, it is very similar in appearance to Alternanthera dentata, which is listed as one of this species's synonyms.

Description

It is an erect, sprawling, herbaceous plant that may grow up to 3 metres tall, though it is usually less than 1 metre as a cultivated plant. The plant's stems, which range between red, green and purple, are delicately hirsute when juvenile, though they'd become glabrescent as they get older. Its opposite leaves, which are 1–10 cm long and 0.7–5 cm wide, are usually coloured purple-specked or luminous reddish-purple. It may lose some of its leaves in winter, making it partially "deciduous" in places that have slightly cool winters.

Its vanilla-coloured, pom-pom flowers are ordered in compact clusters (7–20 mm long) in the top leaf branching and are small in shape. These clusters are rounded to slightly lengthened in shape and are foaled on stalks which are normally 3–10 cm long. It can flower any time of the year, but in temperate and cooler subtropical climates it flowers more often in winter. Its very small brown fruit (1.5–2 mm long) contains one seed that's generally hidden within the older flower parts.

Cultivation
It is used as an ornamental plant with many cultivars, such as 'Purple Prince' and 'Little Ruby' (this name is also used for the similar-looking Alternanthera dentata cultivars). It is often harvested from the wild for regional use as a food and medicine, where it is used as an antiviral and anti-diarrhoea agent. It grows in full sun in moist, well drained soils, where it will multiply by self-seeding. It can also be easily propagated by cuttings.

Range
The plant is native to Brazil, Peru, Ecuador, Colombia, Venezuela, the Guyanas, Nicaragua, Belize, Guatemala, Mexico and the Caribbean.

Moreover, it is naturalised in the wilderness and cultivated land in west Africa, coastal districts of northern and eastern Australia, Florida, South Africa, some of the Pacific Islands, and in shaded ravine slopes and creeks in Java. Most species of joyweed, including this one, are considered as environmental weeds in Queensland, New South Wales, the Northern Territory, and Western Australia.

Gallery

References

brasiliana
Ornamental plants
Garden plants
Flora of Brazil
Flora of the Caribbean
Flora of Ecuador
Flora of Venezuela
Flora of Nicaragua
Flora of Guatemala
Flora of Belize
Flora of Peru
Flora of Mexico
Flora without expected TNC conservation status